Thomas W. Olson is an American playwright and lyricist who adapted L. Frank Baum's The Marvelous Land of Oz, Mary Shelley's Frankenstein (both of which aired on national television and cable), and Stephen Crane's The Red Badge of Courage presented by the Kennedy Center for the Performing Arts, Washington, DC for mainstage and national tour.

From 1978 to 1990, he was playwright in residence for the Children's Theatre Company (CTC) of Minneapolis, Minnesota, where he had also collaborated as an actor in the resident ensemble, stage manager, promotions director, stage director, and literary manager/dramaturg.  Most of his plays are literary adaptations, but he also wrote original works, including a piece about The Troubles in Northern Ireland, The Troubles: Children of Belfast (1987), with music and lyrics by stage director and educator Alan Shorter. Leaving the staff in 1990 to pursue a freelance career, Olson served as literary manager/dramaturg for Minneapolis' Jungle Theater (1996-98), and Managing Director for Bloomington Civic Theater (later Artistry) in Bloomington, MN to open their new facility in 2002 with "Hello, Dolly!" starring Emmy Award-winner Sally Struthers.  

During this period, Thomas was also kept busy writing/directing/performing numerous "industrial" scripts for clients including the American Center for Photography (for artist Robert Bergman), Business Incentives, Hendlin Visual Communications, Jack Morton Productions, Video Buddy, and Minnesota Academic Excellence Foundation.  Of all his projects, he deems his creation of eight half-hour "radio plays" dealing with contemporary urban Native Americans for MIGIZI Communications  - "The Cloud Family Collection" - to be his most challenging yet rewarding collaboration, gently guided by executive director and educator/activist Laura Waterman Wittstock. 

Beyond writing, Olson served three years as a performing arts fellowships panelist with the Minnesota State Arts Board, served on advisory committees and taught at the Playwrights' Center in Minneapolis, guest lectured at the University of Minnesota, and received awards and recognition from the American Theatre Critics Association (Margo Jones Award 1984 with CTC), Twin Cities Drama Critics Circle (1981-83 Kudos Awards as Outstanding Playwright, Outstanding Productions), Minnesota State Arts Board (1990), and a Bush Foundation finalist (1993).

Following his career in the arts, Thomas Olson responded to an invitation to serve as a consultant to social sector organizations as partner with Stern Consulting International (SCI).  Allied closely with the Peter F. Drucker Foundation for Nonprofit Management helmed by Frances Hesselbein (later Leader to Leader Institute), SCI's work with clients primarily encompassed self-assessment, strategic planning, facilitator training, customer research, board policy governance, marketing and promotions, and general administration.  Olson's favorite clients were centered on arts training and performance for young people: Minneapolis' Plymouth Christian Youth Center's Capri Theater project and the nationally-renowned Chicago Children's Choir.

Plays
Works commissioned and produced by Children's Theatre Company, Minneapolis, Minnesota for mainstage and/or national tours:
 The Pied Piper of Hamelin (1978) based on the poem by Robert Browning.  Music by Richard A. Dworsky.  Lyrics by Olson and Dworsky.  Directed by Myron Johnson.
 Hansel and Gretel (1978) based on the folktale by the Brothers Grimm.  Music by Roberta Carlson. Directed by Gene Davis Buck.
 The Sleeping Beauty (1979) based on the folktale by Charles Perrault with additional material by John Donahue.  Music by Steven M. Rydberg. Directed by John Clark Donahue.
 The Story of Babar, the Little Elephant (1980) based on the book by Jean de Brunhoff.  Music by Steven M. Rydberg. Directed by John Clark Donahue.
 The Clown of God (1981) based on the story by Tomie dePaola. Music by Steven M. Rydberg, lyrics by Olson.  Directed by John Clark Donahue.
 The Marvelous Land of Oz (1981) based on the novel by L. Frank Baum.  Music by Richard A. Dworsky, lyrics by Gary Briggle.  Directed by John Clark Donahue.
 Pippi Longstocking (1982) based on the novel and Swedish stage play by Astrid Lindgren. Music by Roberta Carlson, lyrics by Carlson and Olson.  Directed by Myron Johnson.
 Mr. Pickwick's Christmas (1982) based on chapters from the novel by Charles Dickens, music by Hiram Titus.  Directed by John Clark Donahue.
 Phantom of the Opera (1982) based on the novel by Gaston Leroux, with George Muschamp.  Music by Steven M. Rydberg.  Directed by John Clark Donahue.
 The Secret Garden (1983) based on the novel by Frances Hodgson Burnett.  Music by Hiram Titus.  Directed by John Clark Donahue.
 Adventures of Babar (1983) original work based on the characters created by Jean de Brunhoff and Laurent de Brunhoff.  Music by Steven M. Rydberg.  Directed by Myron Johnson.
 Frankenstein (1984) based on the novel by Mary Shelley.  Music by Steven M. Rydberg.  Directed by John Clark Donahue.
 Kate McGrew and The Mystery of the Tattered Trunk (1985) original work based on a story idea by Wendy Lehr.  With Lehr and Richard Russell Ramos.  Music by Hiram Titus.  Directed by Richard Russell Ramos.
 Penrod, the Worst Boy in Town (1985) based on the book by Booth Tarkington.  Music by Anita Ruth, lyrics by Olson and Ruth.  Directed by Jon Cranney.
 The Adventures of Mottel, the Cantor's Son (1986) based on the novel by Sholom Aleichem, with Judith Luck Sher.  Music by Alan Shorter.  Directed by Jon Cranney.
 Beatrix Potter's Christmas (1986), original work based on the life and works of Beatrix Potter.  Music composed or selected by Anita Ruth.  Directed by Myron Johnson.
 Dracula (1987) based on the novel by Bram Stoker.  Music by Alan Shorter.  Directed by Jon Cranney.
 Merry Christmas, Strega Nona (1987) based on the Strega Nona story by Tomie dePaola.  Music by Alan Shorter, lyrics by Olson and Shorter.  Directed by Jon Cranney and Tomie de Paola.
 The Troubles: Children of Belfast(1987) original work.  Music by Alan Shorter, lyrics by Olson and Shorter.
 The Velveteen Rabbit (1988) based on the story by Margery Williams.  Music by Alan Shorter.  Directed by Myron Johnson.
 Sherlock Holmes and the Baker Street Irregulars (1989) original work based on the characters created by Sir Arthur Conan Doyle. Music composed or selected by Michael Koerner.  Directed by Alan Shorter.
 The Hobbit (1990) based on the novel by J.R.R. Tolkien. Music by Alan Shorter.  Directed by Jon Cranney.
 The Jungle Book (1992) based on the story collection by Rudyard Kipling. Music and lyrics by Roberta Carlson.  Directed by Wendy Lehr.
 The Wonderful Wizard of Oz (1993) based on the novel by L. Frank Baum. Music by Victor Zupanc.  Directed by Gary Gisselman.
 The Wind in the Willows (1995) based on the novel by Kenneth Grahame. Music by Roberta Carlson, lyrics by Carlson and Olson.  Directed by Gary Gisselman.
 Linnea in Monet's Garden (1996) based on the book by Christina Bjork and Lena Andersen.  Music by Hiram Titus.  Directed by Wendy Lehr.
 The Prince and the Pauper (1997) based on the novel by Mark Twain.  Music by Victor Zupanc.  Directed by Marti Maraden.
 Tomie de Paola's Strega Nona (1997) based on the story by Tomie de Paola. Music by Roberta Carlson. Lyrics by Carlson and Olson. Music for subsequent productions by Aron Accurso.  Directed by Wendy Lehr.

Works commissioned and presented by other U.S. theater companies:

 Lord of the Flies (1988) based on the novel by William Golding.  Commissioned and presented by Arkansas Arts Center, Little Rock, AR.
 The Secret Garden (1988) based on the novel by Frances Hodgson Burnett.  Commissioned and presented by Alliance Theater Company, Atlanta, GA (mainstage and regional tour).
 The Red Badge of Courage (1991) based on the novel by Stephen Crane.  Presented by Arkansas Arts Center.  Also Kennedy Center for the Performing Arts (mainstage and national tour).
 Through the Wheat (1991) based on the novel by Thomas Alexander Boyd.  Commissioned and presented by Great American History Theater, St. Paul, MN.
 The Witch of Blackbird Pond (1992) based on the novel by Elizabeth George Speare.  Arkansas Arts Center.
 Hans Brinker and the Silver Skates (1992) based on the novel by Mary Mapes Dodge.  Commissioned and presented by First Stage Milwaukee, Milwaukee, WI.
 Heidi (1993) based on the novel by Johanna Spyri. Co-commissioned and presented by Arkansas Arts Center and First Stage Milwaukee.
 Aesop's Fables (1994) based on the stories by Aesop.  Commissioned and presented by Arkansas Arts Center (mainstage and regional tour).
 A Little Princess (1995) based on the novel by Frances Hodgson Burnett.  Commissioned and presented by Arkansas Arts Center.
 The Wind in the Willows (1996) based on the novel by Kenneth Grahame.  Commissioned and presented by Arkansas Arts Center.
 A Glory Over Everything - a tale of Harriet Tubman (1997) based on the life of Harriet Tubman.  Commissioned and presented by Arkansas Arts Center (mainstage and regional tour).

External links
Thomas W. Olson at Plays for New Audiences
Thomas W. Olson on Doollee

Possibly living people
Year of birth missing
American dramatists and playwrights